Syed Irfan Ali Shah is a Pakistani politician, writer and agriculturalist.

He is a son of Syed Ghulam haider Shah, has an MBA and is a member of the Provincial Assembly of the Sindh affiliated with the Pakistan Peoples Party Parliamentarians.

References

Pakistan People's Party politicians